The 2017–18 Greek Basketball Cup was the 43rd edition of Greece's top-tier level professional national domestic basketball cup competition. The previous winners of the cup were Panathinaikos Superfoods. The cup competition started on 13 September 2017, and ended 17 February 2018. AEK won the competition.

Format
The top six placed teams from the top-tier level Greek Basket League 2016–17 season, gained an automatic bye to the 2017–18 Greek Cup quarterfinals. While the eight lower placed teams from the 2016–17 Greek Basket League season; along with all of the teams from the 2nd-tier level Greek A2 Basket League 2017–18 season, and the 3rd-tier level Greek B Basket League 2017–18 season, play in preliminary rounds, competing for the other two quarterfinals places. The quarterfinals and onward rounds are played under a single elimination format.

Preliminary rounds

Phase 1

Round 1
Wednesday 2017-09-13

Note: Pierikos Archelaos decided to forfeit their game against Charilaos Trikoupis.

Round 2
Saturday 2017-09-16

Round 3
Wednesday 2017-09-20

Phase 2

Round 1
Saturday 2017-09-23

Round 2
Wednesday 2017-09-27

Round 3

Final rounds
Faros Larissas and Kolossos Rodou reached the quarterfinals, after winning the preliminary rounds. The other six sides were qualified based on their Greek Basket League 2016–17 season position.

Quarterfinals

Semifinals

Final

Awards

Most Valuable Player

Finals Top Scorer

References

External links
 Official Hellenic Basketball Federation Site 
 Official Greek Basket League Site 
 Official Greek Basket League English website 

Greek Basketball Cup
Cup